Sussex Central High School may refer to:
Sussex Central High School (Delaware) in Georgetown, Delaware
Sussex Central High School (Virginia) in Sussex, Virginia